Murias is one of 18 parishes (administrative divisions)  in Aller, a municipality within the province and autonomous community of Asturias, in northern Spain. 

Villages
 Santibáñez de Murias (Santibanes de Murias)
 Villar 
 Murias

References

Parishes in Aller